The 2013 Campeonato Brasileiro Série C, the third level of the Brazilian League, was contested by 21 clubs, and started on June 1 and ended on December 1, 2013. The four teams in the semifinals were promoted to the 2014 Campeonato Brasileiro Série B, and the worst three teams in Group A and the two worst teams in Group B were relegated to the 2014 Campeonato Brasileiro Série D.

Teams

First stage

Group A

Standings

Results

Group B

Standings

Results

Final stage

Finals

References

3
Campeonato Brasileiro Série C seasons